Sociedad Estatal Loterías y Apuestas del Estado (Spanish for "State Society for State Lotteries and Bets", SELAE) is a Spanish state-owned company. Assigned to the Spanish Ministry of Finance, it is responsible for the management, operation and marketing of all types of lotteries and gambling nationwide or whenever they exceed the scope of a region.

As a public company, it was created in 1984 due to the integration of the services that until then managed the State games —the Mutual Sports Betting Board and the National Lottery Service— and it was last reformed in 2010. It assumes all State powers on lotteries, an activity promoted by the State since 1763, when King Charles III created the Royal Lottery. Since 1812, it also manages the Christmas Lottery, the biggest lottery draw worldwide.

Lotteries

 Lotería Nacional
 Spanish Christmas Lottery
 Sorteo Extraordinario de El Niño
 Lotería Primitiva
 EuroMillones
 El Millón
 BonoLoto
 El Gordo de la Primitiva
 La Quiniela
 El Quinigol
 Lototurf
 Quíntuple Plus

See also
 Ministry of Economy and Finance
 ONCE

References

External links
 Official website
 Quiniela Nocturna

Companies based in the Community of Madrid
Gambling in Spain
1984 establishments in Spain
Companies established in 1984
Lotteries in Spain